The 1995 City of Dundee District Council election took place on 6 April 1995 to elect members of City of Dundee Council, as part of that year's Scottish local elections. These were the first elections for the new unitary authority of the City of Dundee Council. The council subsequently renamed itself in May 1995 as Dundee City Council.

Election results

References

1995
1995 Scottish local elections
20th century in Dundee